The Government of South Tyrol is the chief executive body of the autonomous province of South Tyrol in northern Italy enforcing the provincial laws as written by the Landtag legislature. The government has its seat in the capital city of Bolzano/Bozen.

The local government system is based upon the provisions of the Italian Constitution and the Autonomy Statute of the Region Trentino-Alto Adige/Südtirol. The Landesregierung is headed by a governor, referred to as Landeshauptmann ("State Captain") in German (Italian: Presidente della Giunta Provinciale). The members of the government are elected in a secret ballot by an absolute majority in the Landtag, traditionally dominated by the South Tyrolean People's Party (SVP). However, the composition of the cabinet has to reflect the proportion of the German, Italian and Ladin language groups. The current coalition government formed by the SVP and the Democratic Party is headed by Arno Kompatscher (SVP).

The Civic Network of South Tyrol is the government's official internet website, serving for e-Government and public administration.

See also
Politics of South Tyrol

External links 
 Homepage of the government of South Tyrol